The 2016 Rutgers Scarlet Knights football team represented Rutgers University in the 2016 NCAA Division I FBS football season. It was the Scarlet Knights' third season as a member of the Big Ten Conference, and a member of the East Division. The team was led by Chris Ash, who is in his first season. Rutgers played its home games at High Point Solutions Stadium in Piscataway, New Jersey. They finished the season 2–10, 0–9 in Big Ten play to finish in last place in the East Division.

Schedule
Rutgers announced its 2016 football schedule on July 11, 2013. The 2016 schedule consists of 7 home and 5 away games in the regular season. The Scarlet Knights will host Big Ten foes Illinois, Indiana, Iowa, Michigan, and Penn State, and will travel to Maryland, Michigan State, Minnesota, and Ohio State.

The team will host two of the three non–conference games which are against Howard Bison from the Mid-Eastern Athletic Conference, the New Mexico Lobos from the Mountain West Conference, and Washington Huskies from the Pac-12 Conference (Pac-12).

Game summaries

at Washington

Howard

New Mexico

Iowa

at Ohio State

Michigan

After its game against Ohio State, Rutgers returned home to face Michigan in Michigan's first road game of the season. Michigan defeated Rutgers 49–16 in the previous meeting.

Michigan won in a historic blowout, 78–0. Michigan opened the scoring in the first quarter via a four-yard touchdown run from Ty Isaac. Michigan added to its lead via a 30-yard touchdown pass from Speight to Chesson. Michigan added 29 points in the second quarter via a seven-yard touchdown run from Peppers, two one-yard touchdown runs from Hill, a two-point conversion Garrett Moores rush, and a four-yard touchdown run from Peppers, which made the score 43–0 in favor of Michigan at half-time. Michigan added 14 points in the third quarter via an 11-yard touchdown pass from John O'Korn to Hill, and a 15-yard touchdown run from Karan Higdon. Michigan added 21 points in the fourth quarter via a 13-yard touchdown run from Bobby Henderson, a 44-yard touchdown run from Higdon, and a 34-yard touchdown run from Isaac.

The game was a statistical domination for Michigan. Michigan accumulated 600 yards of offense and eleven touchdowns (nine rushing, two passing); the nine rushing touchdowns tied for the most in modern program history. Khalid Hill recorded three touchdown scores, making him the first Michigan player with three or more scores since Chesson had four in 2015 against Indiana. Michigan improved to 6–0 for the first time since 2011 and recorded its first shutout since the previous season against Northwestern. Michigan's defense held Rutgers to only 39 total yards, two first downs, 14 three-and-outs and 0-for-17 on third down. Michigan recorded its largest margin of victory—during either conference or non-conference play—since it defeated Chicago 85–0 in 1939. This was also the largest margin of victory in any Big Ten game since the same Michigan victory over Chicago. The defeat was Rutgers' worst loss since an 82–0 loss to Princeton in 1888.

Illinois

at Minnesota

Indiana

at Michigan State

Penn State

Penn State piled up 39 points despite the game taking place during an ice storm and limited Rutgers to 87 yards, 5 first downs, and 1-14 third down conversions, managing only 1 yard in the entire second half.

at Maryland

Roster and staff

Awards and honors

Weekly

All-Conference

References

Rutgers
Rutgers Scarlet Knights football seasons
Rutgers Scarlet Knights football